Lao Tzu is a 1996 sculpture by Mark di Suvero, installed at Denver's Acoma Plaza at West 13th Avenue, in the U.S. state of Colorado.  

The artist wants to bring “doodles” to life in space, aiming to engage viewers with his sculptures. He named this artwork Lao Tzu after the Chinese philosopher who founded Taoism in the 6th century, but insists in not strictly assigning particular meanings to his pieces in order to keep them as abstract as possible.

References

 

1996 sculptures
Abstract sculpture
Outdoor sculptures in Denver